In Thint v NDPP; Zuma v NDPP (2008), Thint was a company carrying on business in the field of armaments supply, while Jacob Zuma was a politician.

Investigation
In the course of an investigation into alleged corruption connected with South Africa's defence acquisition programme, the prosecution applied for and obtained 21 search and seizure warrants, issued in terms of section 29 of the National Prosecuting Authority Act (NPAA). Most of these warrants were executed simultaneously. Some three months later, Thint and Zuma were indicted to stand trial on charges of corruption.

Zuma successfully obtained an order in the Durban High Court declaring certain of the warrants invalid, while Thint was unsuccessful in the Pretoria High Court in a similar application. Both these rulings were appealed, as a result of which the Supreme Court of Appeal overturned the judgment of the Durban High Court, and upheld that of the Pretoria High Court. The applicants then approached the Constitutional Court to have the orders of the SCA set aside.

The validity of six of the warrants was in issue. One of them had been executed at Thint's offices in Pretoria, another at "H's" offices in Durban, and the remaining four at two of Zuma's residences and at two of his former offices.

The court began by reviewing the terms of the warrants, which were all substantially similar, and examining the facts relating to the searches and seizures conducted at Thint's and H's offices.

Among the issues which arose for consideration was whether or not the prosecution should have notified the applicants of the application for the issue of the warrants.

Court findings
The court held that, for certain textual and principled reasons, the default position was that an application in terms of section 29 of the Act could be made without notice to the affected parties.

Section 29(4) stated that premises might only be entered under a search warrant "issued in chambers," which indicated that, ordinarily, the procedure was one without notice.

Similarly, reference in section 29(1) to the Investigating Director's entering premises "without prior notice" was an indication that the legislature had intended the default position to be one where no notice was required.

This was in accordance with common sense. If suspects received notice of an impending search, it was not unlikely that they would remove or destroy the evidence sought.

While the judicial officer could justifiably require notice to be given, in the ordinary course the provision of notice had the potential of frustrating the detection and investigation of serious, complex and organised crimes, especially where evidence was in a form in which it could easily be altered or destroyed.

Conclusions
The court held that, in this case, this risk had been present. It had been explained in the affidavit supporting the application that the searches needed to take place simultaneously, and that their purpose might be defeated if the suspects were alerted to them.

In the circumstances, there was no compelling reason to require the State to depart from the ordinary procedure of not giving notice. It could not be said, therefore, that the application had been flawed on this ground.

Although this case dealt with warrants under section 29 of the NPAA, the same would apply to warrants under the Criminal Procedure Act.

Notes 
 Thint (Pty) Ltd v National Director of Public Prosecutions & Others; Zuma v National Director of Public Prosecutions & Others 2009 (1) SA 1 (CC); 2008 (12) BCLR 1197 (CC); 2008 (2) SACR 421 (CC)  

Constitutional Court of South Africa cases
2008 in case law
2008 in South African law